Mario Bianchi (7 January 1939 – April 2022) was an Italian film director and screenwriter. Bianchi directed several features including sexploitation and pornographic films. He spent the majority of the 1990s directing pornography in Italy under the names Nicholas Moore, Tony Yanker and Martin White.

Filmography

References

Footnotes

Sources

External links

1939 births
2022 deaths
Italian film directors
Italian screenwriters
Italian film producers
Italian male screenwriters
Italian pornographic film directors
People from Rome